Viktoriya Gurova-Valyukevich (née , Gurova; born 22 May 1982) is a Russian triple jumper.

Career 
She won the silver medal at the 2003 Summer Universiade, the gold medal at the 2005 European Indoor Championships and finished tenth at the 2005 World Championships. She also competed at the 2004 Olympic Games without reaching the finals.  In 2008, she reached the Olympic final, finishing in 7th.  At the 2012 Summer Olympics she reached the final of the triple jump, finishing in 8th position. On 30 March 2017, she was disqualified, and her 2012 Olympics results were annulled, after her second probe came positive for banned substances.

Her personal best jump is 14.85 metres, achieved in July 2008 in Kazan. The Russian record is currently held by Tatyana Lebedeva with 15.34 metres.

She is married to Slovak triple jumper Dmitrij Vaľukevič.

Achievements

References

External links 

1982 births
Living people
Russian female triple jumpers
Athletes (track and field) at the 2004 Summer Olympics
Athletes (track and field) at the 2008 Summer Olympics
Athletes (track and field) at the 2012 Summer Olympics
Olympic athletes of Russia
Doping cases in athletics
Russian sportspeople in doping cases
Universiade medalists in athletics (track and field)
Sportspeople from Sochi
Universiade silver medalists for Russia